Hickman is an unincorporated community in Smith County, Tennessee, United States. Its ZIP code is 38567.

Demographics

Notes

Unincorporated communities in Smith County, Tennessee
Unincorporated communities in Tennessee